Dysphania multifida is a species of flowering plant in the family Amaranthaceae known by the common names cutleaf goosefoot
 and scented gooosefoot.

It is native to South America, but it can be found on most continents as an introduced species. It grows easily in many habitat types, including disturbed areas such as roadsides. It is an annual herb with variously shaped stems up to about 60 centimeters long, branching and growing upright to flat along the ground. The oblong, glandular leaves are up to 2 centimeters long and have several lobes along each side. The inflorescences are located in leaf axils, spherical in shape and about half a centimeter long, with panicles of clusters located at the ends of stem branches. Each is a dense cluster of tiny flowers enclosing the developing fruit.

References

External links

Jepson Manual Treatment
Chile Flora

multifida
Flora of New Jersey
Plants described in 1753
Taxa named by Carl Linnaeus
Flora without expected TNC conservation status